Oscar Grosnez Corbière Claud Puffin, known as Oscar Puffin, is a television station mascot for ITV Channel Television. Oscar was the star of the birthday greetings programme Puffin's Pla(i)ce and was the last remaining ITV regional mascot to have an on-screen presence. His show was on television from 3 March 1963 until 15 September 2013.

He was born on the island of Burhou in the Channel Islands.

Early development
To introduce Oscar Puffin to viewers, it was claimed that Oscar had been watching Channel Television since its inception in September 1962 and was concerned that there was no on-screen children's birthday club for Channel Islands children. Oscar decided to start one himself, but was in the unfortunate situation of not possessing a name. Therefore, a competition to name him was run in the Channel Islands' local television listing magazine, The Channel Viewer, during February 1963. There were several winners of the competition that include Christine Tongs from Guernsey chose the name 'Oscar', Caroline Romeril from Jersey chose the name 'Grosnez' and Ann Balshaw of Guernsey chose the names 'Corbière Claud'.

Present
In September 2013, it was announced Puffin's Pla(i)ce would no longer be broadcast on television and the last edition was broadcast on 15 September of that year.

Although Oscar no longer has his own show, he remains the mascot of the ITV regional service in the Channel Islands. He does make occasional appearances both on television and online and regularly makes updates on Twitter that have a strong element of absurdity.

External links
 Oscar Puffin on itv.com
 

Bird mascots
British comedy puppets
Fictional seabirds
British mascots
Television mascots
Male characters in television
Male characters in advertising
Television characters introduced in 1963
Channel Islands culture